Water Management Areas (WMAs) are parts of South Africa that are managed by Catchment Management Agencies (CMAs). A CMA is established in terms of the National Water Act of 1998. (As of December 2020 only two CMAs have been established).

The list should be complete, and in accordance with the definitions of the Department of Water Affairs. Apart from these WMAs they also have a number of Water Drainage Areas (some dams are only used for drainage, some seem to be used for both).

List of Water Management Areas

See also 
 List of dams and reservoirs in South Africa
 List of drainage basins of South Africa
 List of rivers of South Africa

References 

 Hydrology
 Water Management Area Maps

 
Water